"Trouble (in the Land) Will Soon Be Over" is a traditional gospel blues song recorded in 1929 by Blind Willie Johnson (voice and guitar) and Willie B. Harris (backing vocals), who is thought to have been his first wife.

Lyrics

"Trouble" is this earthly life; the singer looks forward to a better, heavenly, one: "Trouble will soon be over, sorrow will have an end".

The singer reflects that God was a friend to the Biblical King David, and hopes for like treatment: "I'll gauge that the same God that David served will give me rest some day".

One verse includes the words "I'll take this yoke upon me". It alludes to the Biblical verse Matthew 11:30 "For my yoke is easy, and my burden is light". The yoke is in this instance a carrying pole, designed to assist people with heavy loads.

Other recordings 

 195966Dorothy Love Coates (exact year uncertain )
 2000Geoff Muldaur on the album Password
 2001Chris Thomas King
 2016Sinéad O'Connor on the album God Don't Never Change: The Songs of Blind Willie Johnson

References 

Blind Willie Johnson songs
1929 songs
Songwriter unknown